The 2017 NEAFL season is the seventh season of the North East Australian Football League (NEAFL). The season began on Saturday, 1 April and concluded on Saturday, 9 September with the NEAFL Grand Final.

Participating clubs

Premiership season
Source: NEAFL 2017 season results and fixture

Notable features of the draw include:
 Two regional matches in Newcastle and Wagga Wagga.
 First Friday night match in Darwin, Northern Territory.
 First matches at new South Pine Sports Complex facilities.
 Nineteen confirmed AFL curtain raisers.
 Six aligned AFL academy under-18 series matches.
 NEAFL representative match v TSL in round 11.
All starting times are local.

Round 1

Round 2

Round 3

Round 4

Round 5

Round 6

Round 7

Round 8

Round 9

Round 10

Round 11

Round 12

Round 13

Round 14

Round 15

Round 16

Round 17

Round 18

Round 19

Round 20

Round 21

Win/loss table

Bold – Home game
X – Bye
Opponent for round listed above margin
This table can be sorted by margin

Ladder

Ladder progression
Numbers highlighted in green indicates the team finished the round inside the top six.
Numbers highlighted in blue indicates the team finished in first place on the ladder in that round.
Numbers highlighted in red indicates the team finished in last place on the ladder in that round.
Underlined numbers indicates the team had a bye during that round.

Finals series

Elimination finals

Preliminary finals

Grand final

Representative match
The NEAFL representative team played against the Tasmanian State League representative team in the league's sole state match for the year. The match was played on 10 June at Blundstone Arena with the NEAFL representative side winning by seventeen points.

Squad
The 2017 NEAFL representative squad consisted of players from all NEAFL clubs excluding AFL reserves teams. The team contained eight former AFL-listed players. The team was coached by AFL Queensland Hall of Famer and former AFL footballer, John Blair.

Rising Star nominations
The NEAFL Rising Star is awarded to the most promising young talent in the NEAFL competition. Players are nominated each week and must be under the age of 21 and have played less than 20 NEAFL games.

References

External links

http://www.neafl.com.au/ Official NEAFL website

Australian rules football competition seasons
NEAFL